Alexander Shcherbina (born August 6, 1988) is a Russian professional ice hockey forward who is currently an unrestricted free agent. He last played for HC Sochi in the Kontinental Hockey League (KHL), having previously played for SKA Saint Petersburg and Vityaz Chekhov of the KHL.

On May 6, 2014, Scherbina marked his return to the KHL in signing a one-year contract with expansion club, HC Sochi.

References

External links

1988 births
Living people
SKA Saint Petersburg players
HC Sochi players
HC Vityaz players
Universiade bronze medalists for Russia
Universiade medalists in ice hockey
Competitors at the 2013 Winter Universiade
Russian ice hockey forwards